Reliant Tom is an American electronic post-rock band based in Brooklyn, New York.

Background
Reliant Tom originated as a band in 2015. The Brooklyn-based post-rock electronic band and experimental performance art group is centered around its core creative duo of composer Monte Weber along with choreographer and vocalist Claire Cuny.

The duo’s first two releases included a self-released, self-titled EP in 2016 and a full-length debut effort Bad Orange in 2018. Released in the Spring 2020, through Chicago-based Diversion Records, the group's sophomore effort is entitled Play & Rewind.

Reception
Pop Dust's Randy Radic stated of their track "11-2", "Claire's haunting tones invest the lyrics with stark melancholy”.

Matt Matasci of MXDWN wrote, "Claire Cuny’s rich, sultry vocals take the forefront. Plinking piano keys and a gradually shift into heavier instrumentation add a dramatic flare to the song, showcasing the undeniable chemistry of Cuny and her bandmate Monte Weber” regarding their song "Never Mind The Garbage". About the same track, Black Book Magazine wrote, "Building from moody ballad, to Cobain-worthy midesection and ending in a sparse trance of harmonis, the track viscerally captures the rise and fall of emotions that come with death”.

Discography
 Reliant Tom EP (2016)
 Bad Orange (2018)
 Play & Rewind (2020)

References

External links
ReliantTom.com Official site

Musical groups established in 2015